Sapore di mare 2 - Un anno dopo is a 1983 Italian teen romantic comedy film directed by Bruno Cortini. It is the sequel of Time for Loving.

Cast

 Massimo Ciavarro: Fulvio Comanducci
 Isabella Ferrari: Selvaggia 
 Eleonora Giorgi: Tea 
 Mauro Di Francesco: Uberto Colombo
 Angelo Cannavacciuolo: Paolo Pinardi
 Karina Huff: Susan
 Gianni Ansaldi: Gianni
 Giorgia Fiorio: Giorgia 
 Ugo Bologna: Carraro
 Gianfranco Barra: Antonio Pinardi

References

External links
 

1983 films
Italian romantic comedy films
1980s Italian-language films
1983 romantic comedy films
Films set in the 1960s
1980s Italian films